Holly Wood or holly wood may refer to:

 Holly Wood, Oxfordshire, England, a Site of Special Scientific Interest
 Holly Wood, Sandwell, England, in the List of local nature reserves in England
 Holly wood, wood from a holly plant
 Holly Wood, a character in the game Final Fight

See also

 Holli Would, a fictional character in the film Cool World
 Holly Woods (born 1953), American rock singer
 Holly Woodlawn (1946–2015), actress
 Holy Wood (disambiguation)
 Hollywood (disambiguation)
 
 Holly (disambiguation)
 Wood (disambiguation)